Cecilioides acicula, common name the "blind snail" or "blind awlsnail", is a species of very small, air-breathing land snail, a terrestrial pulmonate gastropod mollusk in the family Ferussaciidae.

This is a subterranean species.

Description 
This animal is white, there are two pairs of tentacles, but eyes are lacking.

The shell is long and narrow, up to a maximum of 5.5 mm and a width of 1.2 mm. The shell is colorless, glassy and transparent when it is fresh, a somewhat opaque milky-white when it is not fresh.

Habitat 
The habitat of this species is underground, quite some distance below the surface. It is more common in soils with a high level of calcium.

Because of its subterranean habitat, this species is often found only as an empty shell, in such places as mole hills, ant hills, or in flood debris of rivers.

Distribution 
Distribution of this species is central European and southern European.

This species native range is Mediterranean Europe, specifically, Western Europe (Great Britain and Ireland, Netherlands, …) and Central Europe (Czech Republic - least concern (LC), Poland, Slovakia, Ukraine …).

It has also been accidentally introduced to several other countries:
 Latvia since 2006
 Bermuda since 1861
 Canada: Ontario
 The United States (in Pennsylvania and in Florida, in Maryland since 1959, in Virginia since 2006, in California, in New Jersey and in New Mexicoà
 New Zealand.
 Australia.

References

 Spencer, H.G., Marshall, B.A. & Willan, R.C. (2009). Checklist of New Zealand living Mollusca. pp 196–219 in Gordon, D.P. (ed.) New Zealand inventory of biodiversity. Volume one. Kingdom Animalia: Radiata, Lophotrochozoa, Deuterostomia. Canterbury University Press, Christchurch.

External links

Cecilioides acicula at Animalbase taxonomy,short description, distribution, biology,status (threats), images 
Cecilioides acicula Fauna Europaea

Ferussaciidae
Gastropods described in 1774
Taxa named by Otto Friedrich Müller